The 1979 Pot Black was a professional invitational snooker tournament, which was held in the Pebble Mill Studios in Birmingham. 8 players were competing in 2 four player groups. All matches were one-frame shoot-outs except the final which was played in the best of 3 frames on a one-hour programme.

Broadcasts were on BBC2 and started at 21:00 on Friday 29 December 1978 Alan Weeks presented the programme with Ted Lowe as commentator and Sydney Lee as referee.

This tournament had the TV debut of Steve Davis who played veteran namesake Fred Davis on the programme transmitted 19 January and won the frame 83-23 but failed to reach the semi-finals. The first Pot Black champion Ray Reardon regained the title 10 years after his first beating reigning champion Doug Mountjoy 2–1.

Main draw

Group 1

Group 2

Knockout stage

References

Pot Black
1979 in snooker
1979 in English sport